Kristina Mladenovic and Yanina Wickmayer defeated Asia Muhammad and Sabrina Santamaria in the final, 6–3, 6–2 to win the women's doubles tennis title at the 2022 Korea Open. 

Choi Ji-hee and Han Na-lae were the defending champions from when the event was a WTA 125 tournament, but chose to compete with different partners this year. Choi partnered Park So-hyun, but lost in the first round to Ekaterina Alexandrova and Yana Sizikova. Han partnered Jang Su-jeong, but lost in the semifinals to Muhammad and Santamaria.

Seeds

Draw

Draw

References

External links
 Main draw

Korea Open – Women's doubles
2022 Women's Doubles